New Hampshire Route 149 (abbreviated NH 149) is a  secondary east–west state highway in Hillsborough County in the southern part of the U.S. state of New Hampshire. The road runs between the towns of Weare and Hillsborough.

The eastern terminus of NH 149 is in Weare at New Hampshire Route 77 in the area known as South Weare. The western terminus is in the center of Hillsborough at U.S. Route 202 and New Hampshire Route 9. In Hillsborough, NH 149 is known as Bridge Street. Between Weare and Hillsborough, the highway provides access to Deering Reservoir and Pleasant Pond.

Major intersections

References

External links

 New Hampshire State Route 149 on Flickr

149
Transportation in Hillsborough County, New Hampshire